Złotówka  is a village in the administrative district of Gmina Lubsza, within Brzeg County, Opole Voivodeship, in southwestern Poland.
The name is also a colloquial name for the Polish one zloty coin.

References

Villages in Brzeg County